National Route 182 is a national highway of Japan connecting Niimi, Okayama and Fukuyama, Hiroshima in Japan, with a total length of 79.7 km (49.52 mi).

History
Route 182 was originally designated on 18 May 1953 from Hiroshima to Matsue. This was redesignated as Route 54 on 1 April 1963.

References

National highways in Japan
Roads in Hiroshima Prefecture
Roads in Okayama Prefecture